"Clyde Bruckman's Final Repose" is the fourth episode of the third season of the American science fiction television series The X-Files. Directed by David Nutter and written by Darin Morgan, the installment serves as a "Monster-of-the-Week" story, that is, a stand-alone plot unconnected to the overarching mythology of The X-Files. Originally aired by the Fox network on October 13, 1995, "Clyde Bruckman's Final Repose" received a Nielsen rating of 10.2 and was seen by 15.38 million viewers. The episode received critical acclaim, and several writers have named it among the best in the series. The episode won both an Emmy for Outstanding Writing in a Drama Series as well as an Emmy for Outstanding Guest Actor in a Drama Series.

The show centers on FBI special agents Fox Mulder (David Duchovny) and Dana Scully (Gillian Anderson), who work on cases linked to the paranormal called X-Files. While Mulder is a believer in phenomena conventionally classed as paranormal, the skeptical Scully has been assigned to debunk his work. As they work together over time, the two have developed mutual professional respect and a deep friendship. In this episode, Mulder and Scully investigate a series of murders of psychics and fortune tellers. The two are assisted by Clyde Bruckman (Peter Boyle), an enigmatic and reluctant individual who possesses the ability to foresee how people are going to die.

Morgan wished to write an episode of The X-Files wherein one of the characters commits suicide at the end. Although Morgan was initially afraid to add humor to his script, he created a compromise by making the episode as dark as possible. Several of the characters' names are references to silent film-era actors and screenwriters. Notably, the episode features a prediction by Bruckman—that Agent Scully will not die—that is later bookended by the sixth-season episode "Tithonus".

Plot 
In a liquor store in St. Paul, Minnesota, Clyde Bruckman (Peter Boyle), a life insurance salesman, purchases a bottle of scotch, a tabloid newspaper, and a lottery ticket and leaves. In the street, he almost bumps into an inconspicuous man (Stuart Charno), who heads to a palm reader named Madame Zelma (Karin Konoval). After seeking his fortune, the inconspicuous man attacks and kills her. A few days later, the eyes and entrails of a tea leaf reader, who was also a doll collector, have been found in her apartment, her body being missing. FBI agents Fox Mulder (David Duchovny) and Dana Scully (Gillian Anderson) arrive at the scene of that murder to help the local cops, who have recruited the help of a psychic, the eccentric Stupendous Yappi (Jaap Broeker). Although the psychic delivers extremely vague clues, the cops are thoroughly impressed; both Scully and Mulder, however, are not.

Meanwhile, after Bruckman takes the trash out for his neighbor, he discovers the body of Madame Zelma outside in his dumpster. When interviewed by Mulder and Scully, he reveals details about the crime that he could not have known from the media accounts, which causes Mulder to believe that Bruckman has psychic ability. Mulder insists that Bruckman join them in a visit to the crime scene at the doll collector's apartment. Thanks to seemingly psychically gained information from Bruckman, her body is soon found in a nearby lake.

At the police station, Mulder tests Bruckman's ability by having him handle various objects to see what they "tell" him. It becomes apparent that Bruckman's only real psychic talent is an ability to see details of people's deaths. Scully arrives with a key chain bearing the insignia of an investment company that uses astrology to make financial predictions, taken from the doll collector's body—the same key chain was found on two of the other dead fortunetellers. Bruckman knows that the firm is owned by one Claude Dukenfield, not through a psychic revelation but because he coincidentally sold the man an insurance policy recently. He says that Mulder and Scully will not be able to talk to Dukenfield though, because he has been murdered.

Mulder and Scully drive Bruckman to a wooded spot where Bruckman has said they will find Dukenfield's body. As they tromp through the woods, Bruckman explains how he gained his ability following the death of Buddy Holly and The Big Bopper in a plane crash. Bruckman cannot pinpoint the exact spot where the body is, however, so they return to the parked car, where they see a lifeless hand sticking out of the wet mud underneath. Traces of silk fibers are subsequently found on Dukenfield similar to fibers found on previous victims—they are later analyzed and found to be from lace.

At his home Bruckman has gotten a note from the killer saying he is going to die when they first meet, and telling him to say "hi" to the FBI agents. The killer apparently also has some psychic ability—the postmark is dated before Bruckman joined the murder investigation. Bruckman describes Mulder's death as the killer sees it: getting his throat slit by the killer after stepping in a pie in a kitchen. However Bruckman tells Mulder he's not able to see what happens afterwards. Meanwhile, the inconspicuous man consults a tarot card reader (Alex Diakun), who says that the killer seeks answers from "a man with special wisdom" and that his confusion will soon abruptly end "with the arrival of a woman—a blonde or a brunette, possibly a redhead." When there is just one card left unturned, the killer says that it is not meant for him but for the reader, and turns it over to reveal the "death" card.

Since the killer knows Bruckman's home address, the agents bring him to a hotel where they take turns guarding him. While Scully does not believe in Bruckman's power, the two develop a fast friendship. Scully asks Bruckman if he can see his own end. He replies that he can see their end—that they will end up in bed together, in a very special moment neither of them will ever forget. This reinforces her skepticism. Bruckman asks Scully why she is not interested in knowing how she will die. Scully finally asks him to tell her, to which Bruckman replies, "You don't."

A detective named Havez (Dwight McFee) takes over as Bruckman's guard when Mulder and Scully are called to investigate yet another new murder victim: the tarot card reader. As they leave they bump into a bellhop who is delivering food to Bruckman's room. The bellhop is actually the killer, and when he enters the room (while Havez is in the washroom), he is delighted to discover that Bruckman has been brought right to where he works. As he is about to kill Bruckman, Havez re-enters and the killer attacks and kills him instead. Meanwhile, Scully finds the same silk fiber at the new crime scene, and realizing that the bellhop had it on his tray, deduces that he is the murderer. They rush back to the hotel. Mulder chases the killer to the basement kitchen and the scene plays out as described in Bruckman's earlier premonition, but when the killer attacks Mulder, Scully arrives in the nick of time and shoots him—what Bruckman had seen was the dying killer's last thoughts, not Mulder's death.

Unable to find Bruckman in the hotel, Mulder and Scully return to Bruckman's apartment to find that Bruckman has committed suicide; Scully sees a plastic bag has been tied around his head, and that he is clutching a bottle of pills in his hand. Scully sits on Bruckman's bed holding his hand, deeply moved, just as he had predicted. That night Scully sees a commercial for the Stupendous Yappi on TV, causing her to throw her phone at it.

Production

Conception and writing

This episode was the second of four episodes written for the series by Darin Morgan during its initial run. Morgan had previously written the second season episode "Humbug", which was a stylistic break from the series' norm, being more overtly humorous. After working on said episode, Morgan worried that he had written the script the "wrong" way, and so he decided to write a more traditional X-Files story the next time he wrote an episode. To get inspiration, Morgan watched the first-season episode "Beyond the Sea", which features an unreliable criminal who claims to have psychic powers. Morgan was struck by the story and its tone, and sought to write a script that emulated its overall feel. Initially, Morgan was leery about focusing too much on humor, so he decided to make his episode very dark; in the end, however, he decided to lighten some of the mood by adding in some jokes. The tone of the episode was also affected by Morgan suffering from depression, which led to him developing a plot in which the main character kills himself in the end.

The episode focuses heavily on free will and fatalistic determinismtopics that Morgan was drawn to due to his frustration with the task of plotting episode stories. Morgan later explained that the way Bruckman and the killer interact was "really easy to plot, but [makes] the story seem complicated." While working on the script, Morgan realized that while Mulder is supposed to be intelligent, were he to talk to a "normal person" in real life, he would come across as paranoid or insane. The writer was thus inspired to "shake up Mulder's image" in the episode by making him fallible and foolish. This approach is illustrated by how Mulder views Bruckman "only as a phenomenon" and not as a person, whereas Scully views the titular character as a human, first and foremost.

Bruckman's cryptic prediction that Scully would not die "sent fans into a frenzy" due to its implications. Morgan claimed that Bruckman knew full well how Scully would die, but decided to withhold the information simply because he liked her. However, many interpreted the line to mean that Scully could not actually die and was, in essence, immortal. Frank Spotnitz later argued that this sub-plot was bookended by the sixth-season episode "Tithonus," which showed Scully starting to die, only to have her come back, fulfilling Bruckman's prophecy. Spotnitz later called this ending "very satisfying." However, in 2011, Spotnitz seemed to suggest that Scully was, in fact, immortal. This interpretation was seemingly verified by series creator Chris Carter in a 2014 reddit AMA.

Bruckman's quip about Fox Mulder dying by autoerotic asphyxiation was inspired both by the previous references in the series to Mulder's enjoyment of pornography, as well as a book that Morgan had read about homicide investigations. Morgan later noted that while Bruckman's line may have been prophetic, he added it simply to be funny.

Many of the names used in the episode reference or allude to notable figures during the silent film era. The name "Clyde Bruckman", for instance, is a direct reference to a writer and director of silent comedies who committed suicide in 1955. Detective Havez and Detective Cline references the writer Jean Havez and the director Eddie Cline, respectively. The names of one of the victims, Claude Dukenfield, was the real name of W. C. Fields. The name of the hotel in this episode, "Le Damfino", references the boat in the Buster Keaton movie The Boat.

Casting and filming
The titular character—who was based on Morgan's "depressive" father—was originally written with Bob Newhart in mind, but Peter Boyle was later cast. Although Chris Carter preferred to hire lesser-known individuals for the show, he believed Boyle to be "such a gifted character actor" that he made an exception. The character of the Stupendous Yappi, whom Morgan described as a cross between Uri Geller and the Amazing Kreskin, was specifically written for Jaap Broeker, David Duchovny's stand-in. The character later appeared again in the episode "Jose Chung's From Outer Space". Stuart Charno—credited as Stu Charno in the episode—played the killer in this episode; he is the husband of former series writer Sara Charno.

"Clyde Bruckman's Final Repose" was filmed in British Columbia, as was the rest of the show's third season. Visual effects producer Mat Beck and Toby Lindala created the elaborate dream sequence in which Bruckman's body decomposes. To create the effect, the design team rigged up a dummy with skeleton made out of copper wiring. The team then covered this frame with gelatinous skin and heated the wiring; this melted the skin, creating the illusion that the body was disintegrating. The entire sequence comprised eight discrete segments, some of which featured Boyle in makeup, some the dummy, and some a CGI skeleton. Because episode director David Nutter was working under a number of constraints, Morgan was effectively allowed to serve "as a producer", and after filming for the episode was completed, Morgan worked closely with the series' editor to produce the final cut. This version was originally 10 minutes over the time limit, resulting in multiple scenes featuring Bruckman and Scully being excised from the episode.

Reception

"Clyde Bruckman's Final Repose" originally aired on the Fox network on October 13, 1995. The episode earned a Nielsen rating of 10.2, with an 18 share, meaning that roughly 10.2 percent of all television-equipped households, and 18 percent of households watching television, were tuned in to the episode. The episode was watched by 15.38 million viewers. The success of the episode led to it earning two Primetime Emmy Awards—writer Darin Morgan won the Emmy for Outstanding Writing in a Drama Series, while Peter Boyle won the Emmy for Outstanding Guest Actor in a Drama Series.

"Clyde Bruckman's Final Repose" has been critically lauded. Robert Shearman and Lars Pearson, in their book Wanting to Believe: A Critical Guide to The X-Files, Millennium & The Lone Gunmen, gave the episode a full five stars and called it "a little slice of genius". The two applauded the episode's rich humor, as well as its exploration of extremely dark themes in a lighthearted way. Shearman and Pearson concluded that "the troubled questions Morgan poses here" about free will and death "are best answered by the writing of the episode itself … an episode like this isn't random—it's finely wrought, and thoughtful, and compassionate, and is a triumph of individualism." Author Phil Farrand rated the episode as his third favorite episode of the first four seasons in his book The Nitpickers Guide to the X-Files. Both Paul Cornell and Keith Topping, in the book Extreme Possibilities, applauded the episode; Cornell called it "an extraordinary piece of work" and altogether gorgeous", whereas Topping labelled it a "little gem". Conversely, Martin Day, in the same book, wrote a negative review, calling it "duller than a dull thing with dull knobs", despite noting that it was "clever and well-acted".

Paula Vitaris from Cinefantastique gave the episode four stars out of four and called it "one of those rare episodes where everything comes together—funny, bizarre, absurd, ironic, and sad." She applauded Boyle's acting, noting that he "gives a performance that simply takes over the TV screen", and argued that "only actors as strong as Duchovny and Anderson, with their blissfully deadpan delivery, could withstand such a titanic presence, but withstand it they do." Entertainment Weekly gave the episode a rare "A+", writing, "Boyle gets lots of help from another superlative, laugh-a-minute script [which] nicely captures one of the overarching themes of the show: fate and man's isolation." Reviewer Zack Handlen of The A.V. Club gave the episode an "A" and wrote positively of the ending, writing that, "for an episode that ends with a likable character killing himself, 'Bruckman' isn't what I'd call a downer." He called the entry his "favorite episode of The X-Files because it's funny, suspenseful, does well by Scully and Mulder, and creates some indelible characters."

Since its original airing, critics have listed "Clyde Bruckman's Final Repose" among the best X-Files episodes. TV Guide called it the tenth greatest episode in television history. Review website IGN named it the best standalone X-Files episode of the entire series, writing that the episode " is a distinctive episode of the series, mixing a healthy amount of humor [...] with some very nasty business [...] In just 44 minutes, Boyle creates a fully formed character who makes a big impact in his one and only appearance." Topless Robot named it the ninth-funniest episode of the series. Starpulse listed it as the third-best X-Files episode. Charlie Jane Anders and Javier Grillo-Marxuach of io9 included it on the list of "10 TV Episodes that Changed Television". Tom Kessenich, in Examination: An Unauthorized Look at Seasons 6–9 of the X-Files, named the episode the seventh-best installment of the series, noting that it features "a wonderful blend of humor, drama, and pathos, something The X-Files did better than just about any other show this past decade." The cast and crew of the series have expressed their enjoyment of the installment. Duchovny considers "Clyde Bruckman's Final Repose" to be one of his favorite episodes of the third season. Nutter highlighted it as one of the most enjoyable entries that he had worked on. He also noted that, "the writing was so tight and so crisp and so fresh that I think, as a director, the only thing you have to do is create the atmosphere, set up the characters, set up the shots and you are basically invisible. Then you step back and just let it happen." Series writer and producer Frank Spotnitz stated that the episode worked on many levels and that it is his favorite of the episodes written for the show by Morgan. In 2016, Ira Madison of Vulture.com named it the best episode of the series and "one of the best episodes of television ever", stating that the episode "takes every element that made the series so iconic and throws them all into one heartbreaking installment".

Footnotes

References

External links 

"Clyde Bruckman's Final Repose" on The X-Files official website
 

1995 American television episodes
The X-Files (season 3) episodes
Emmy Award-winning episodes
Television episodes about death
Television episodes about precognition
Television episodes directed by David Nutter
Television episodes set in Minnesota